Lester B. Luborsky (1920–2009) was one of the founders of scientific research in psychotherapy.

Luborsky was born and raised in Philadelphia.  He graduated from Philadelphia Central High School and then earned his bachelor's degree at Pennsylvania State University.

Luborsky received his Ph.D. in psychology from Duke University.  He was an instructor at the University of Illinois for two years.  He then spent eleven years at the Menninger Foundation before joining the faculty of the University of Pennsylvania.

In 1973–1974 Luborsky served as president of the Society for Psychotherapy Research.

Career
Author of nine books and over 400 articles, he had the rare ability to apply a scientific eye to the personal processes of psychotherapy. He examined the factors that make psychotherapy work, along with large-scale studies of outcome. Among his major research contributions were the development of methods that could be used to study therapeutic processes, notably the symptom–context method, which gives a way to understand and study symptoms as they occur, and the CCRT (core conflictual relationship theme) method, which allows for the study of the psychoanalytic concept of the transference. Other measures include The Helping Alliance, which gives a way to study the impact of the therapeutic relationship, and Health–Sickness Rating Scale, which was later adapted to become the Global Assessment of Functioning (Axis V) in the Diagnostic and Statistical Manual (DSM), as noted in the DSM-IV.

He received numerous awards, among them the Gold Medal for Lifetime Achievement in the Applications of Psychology by the American Psychological Association, The Sigourney Award for Distinguished Contributions to the Field of Psychoanalysis, and The Award for Distinguished Psychoanalytic Theory and Research by the American Psychoanalytic Association.

Publications
 Luborsky (1984) Principles of Psychoanalytic Psychotherapy: A Manual for Supportive-Expressive (SE) Treatment
 Luborsky & Crits-Christoph (1990, reissued in 1998) Understanding Transference, The Core Conflictual Theme Method
 Luborsky (1996) The Symptom-Context Method: Symptoms as Opportunities in Psychotherapy
 Luborsky, L & Luborsky, E (2006) Research & Psychotherapy: The Vital Link

See also

Sources

Further reading
 
 

1920 births
Scientists from Philadelphia
Pennsylvania State University alumni
Duke University alumni
University of Illinois faculty
University of Pennsylvania faculty
2009 deaths